Tony Gibson may refer to:

 Tony Gibson (American football) College football defensive coordinator for NC State and previously West Virginia
 Tony Gibson (psychologist)  (1914–2001), English psychologist, anarchist, and model
 Tony Gibson (auto racing) (born 1964), American auto racing crew chief